Internal medicine or general internal medicine (in Commonwealth nations) is the medical specialty dealing with the prevention, diagnosis, and treatment of internal diseases. Doctors specializing in internal medicine are called internists, or physicians (without a modifier) in Commonwealth nations. Internists are medical specialists that are skilled in the management of patients who have undifferentiated or multi-system disease processes. Internists care for hospitalized (inpatient) and ambulatory (outpatient) patients and may play a major role in teaching and research.  Internists are qualified physicians with postgraduate training in internal medicine and should not be confused with "interns", a term for doctors in their first year of residency training.

Internal medicine and family medicine are often confused as equivalent in the United States and Commonwealth nations (see below).

Because internal medicine patients are often seriously ill or require complex investigations, internists do much of their work in hospitals. Internists often have subspecialty interests in diseases affecting particular organs or organ systems. The certification process along with the list of possible sub-specialties vary around the world.

Internal medicine is also a specialty within clinical pharmacy and veterinary medicine.

Etymology and historical development 

The etymology of the term internal medicine in English is rooted in the German term  from the 19th century. Internal medicine was initially characterized by determination of the underlying "internal" or pathological causes of symptoms and syndromes by use of laboratory investigations in addition to bedside clinical assessment of patients. In contrast, physicians in previous generations, such as the 17th-century physician Thomas Sydenham, who is known as the father of English medicine or "the English Hippocrates", had developed nosology (the study of diseases) via the clinical approach of diagnosis and management, by careful bedside study of the natural history of diseases and their treatment. Sydenham eschewed dissection of corpses and scrutiny of the internal workings of the body, for considering the internal mechanisms and causes of symptoms. It was thus subsequent to the 17th century that there was a rise in anatomical pathology and laboratory studies, with Giovanni Battista Morgagni, an Italian anatomist of the 18th century, being considered the father of anatomical pathology. Laboratory investigations became increasingly significant, with contribution of doctors including German physician and bacteriologist Robert Koch in the 19th century. The 19th century saw the rise of internal medicine that combined the clinical approach with use of investigations. Many early-20th-century American physicians studied medicine in Germany and brought this medical field to the United States. Thus, the name "internal medicine" was adopted in imitation of the existing German term.

Historically, some of the oldest traces of internal medicine can be traced from ancient India and ancient China. The earliest texts about internal medicine are the Ayurvedic anthologies of Charaka.

Role of internal medicine physicians 
Internal medicine specialists, also known as general internal medicine specialists or general medicine physicians in Commonwealth countries, are specialist physicians trained to manage particularly complex or multisystem disease conditions that single-organ-disease specialists may not be trained to deal with. They may be asked to tackle undifferentiated presentations that cannot be easily fitted within the expertise of a single-organ specialty, such as dyspnea, fatigue, weight loss, chest pain, confusion or change in conscious state. They may manage serious acute illnesses that affect multiple organ systems at the same time in a single patient, and they may manage multiple chronic diseases that a single patient may have.

Many internal medicine physicians decide to subspecialize in specific organ systems. General internal medicine specialists do not provide necessarily less expertise than single-organ specialists, rather, they are trained for a specific role of caring for patients with multiple simultaneous problems or complex comorbidities.

Perhaps because it is complex to explain treatment of diseases that are not localized to a single-organ, there has been confusion about the meaning of internal medicine and the role of an "internist".  Although internists may act as primary care physicians, they are not "family physicians", "family practitioners", or "general practitioners", or "GPs", whose training is not solely concentrated on adults and may include surgery, obstetrics, and pediatrics. The American College of Physicians defines internists as "physicians who specialize in the prevention, detection and treatment of illnesses in adults". While there is overlap in the population served by both internal medicine and family medicine physicians, internists typically focus on adult care with an emphasis on diagnosis while family medicine incorporates holistic care for the entire family unit.  Internists also receive significant training in many of the recognized sub-specialties of the profession (see below) and are trained in both inpatient and outpatient settings.  Family medicine physicians receive education on a broad range of conditions and typically train in an outpatient setting with minimal experience in a hospital setting. The historical roots of internal medicine lie in the movement to incorporate scientific into medical practice in the 1800s.  Family medicine grew from the primary care movement in the 1960s.

Professional education and training

The training and career pathways for internists vary considerably across the world.

Many programs require previous undergraduate education prior to medical school admission.  This "pre-medical" education is typically four or five years in length.  Graduate medical education programs vary in length by country.  Medical education programs are tertiary-level courses, undertaken at a medical school attached to a university.  In the United States, medical school consists of four years.  Hence, gaining a basic medical education may typically take eight years, depending on jurisdiction and university.

Following completion of entry-level training, newly graduated medical practitioners are often required to undertake a period of supervised practice before the licensure, or registration, is granted, typically one or two years. This period may be referred to as "internship", "conditional registration", or "foundation programme". Then, doctors may finally follow specialty training in internal medicine if they wish, typically being selected to training programs through competition. In North America, this period of postgraduate training is referred to as residency training, followed by an optional fellowship if the internist decides to train in a subspecialty.

In the United States and in most countries, residency training for internal medicine lasts three years and centers on secondary and tertiary levels of care. In Commonwealth countries trainees are often called senior house officers for four years after the completion of their medical degree (foundation and core years). After this period, they are able to advance to registrar grade when they undergo a compulsory subspecialty training (including acute internal medicine or a dual subspecialty including internal medicine). This latter stage of training is achieved through competition rather than just by yearly progress as the first years of postgraduate training.

Certification
In the United States, three organizations are responsible for the certification of trained internists (i.e., doctors who have completed an accredited residency training program) in terms of their knowledge, skills, and attitudes that are essential for excellent patient care: the American Board of Internal Medicine, the American Osteopathic Board of Internal Medicine and the Board of Certification in Internal Medicine. In the UK, the General Medical Council oversees licensing and certification of Internal Medicine physicians.  The Royal Australasian College of Physicians confers fellowship to internists (and sub-specialists) in Australia.  The Medical Council of Canada oversees licensing of internists in Canada.

Subspecialties

United States of America 
In the United States, two organizations are responsible for certification of subspecialists within the field: the American Board of Internal Medicine and the American Osteopathic Board of Internal Medicine. Physicians (not only internists) who successfully pass board exams receive "board certified" status.

American Board of Internal Medicine 
The following are the subspecialties recognized by the American Board of Internal Medicine.

Adolescent medicine
Adult congenital heart disease
Advanced heart failure and transplant cardiology
Allergy & immunology, concerned with the diagnosis, treatment and management of allergies, asthma and disorders of the immune system.
Cardiovascular disease, dealing with disorders of the heart and blood vessels*
Clinical cardiac electrophysiology
Critical care medicine
Endocrinology, diabetes & metabolism, dealing with disorders of the endocrine system and its specific secretions called hormones
Gastroenterology, concerned with the field of digestive diseases
Geriatric medicine
Hematology, concerned with blood, the blood-forming organs and its disorders.
Hospice & palliative medicine
Infectious disease, concerned with disease caused by a biological agent such as by a virus, bacterium or parasite
Interventional cardiology
Medical oncology, dealing with the chemotherapeutic (chemical) and/or immunotherapeutic (immunological) treatment of cancer
Nephrology, dealing with the study of the function and diseases of the kidney
 Neurocritical care
Pulmonary disease, dealing with diseases of the lungs and the respiratory tract
Rheumatology, devoted to the diagnosis and therapy of rheumatic diseases
Sleep medicine
Sports medicine
Transplant hepatology

American College of Osteopathic Internists 
The American College of Osteopathic Internists recognizes the following subspecialties:

Allergy/immunology
Cardiology
Cardiac electrophysiology
Critical care medicine
Endocrinology
Gastroenterology
Geriatrics
Hematology/oncology
Interventional cardiology
Infectious diseases
Nephrology
Oncology
Palliative care medicine
Pulmonary Diseases
Pulmonary / critical care medicine
Pulmonology
Rheumatology
Sleep medicine

United Kingdom 
In the United Kingdom, the three medical Royal Colleges (the Royal College of Physicians of London, the Royal College of Physicians of Edinburgh and the Royal College of Physicians and Surgeons of Glasgow) are responsible for setting curricula and training programmes through the Joint Royal Colleges Postgraduate Training Board (JRCPTB), although the process is monitored and accredited by the independent General Medical Council (which also maintains the specialist register).

Doctors who have completed medical school spend two years in foundation training completing a basic postgraduate curriculum. After two years of Core Medical Training (CT1/CT2), or three years of Internal Medicine Training (IMT1/IMT2/IMT3) as of 2019, since and attaining the Membership of the Royal College of Physicians, physicians commit to one of the medical specialties: 
 Acute internal medicine (with possible subspecialty in stroke medicine)
 Allergy
 Audio vestibular medicine
 Aviation and space medicine
 Cardiology (with possible subspecialty in stroke medicine)
 Clinical genetics
 Clinical neurophysiology
 Clinical oncology
 Clinical pharmacology and therapeutics (with possible subspecialty in stroke medicine)
 Dermatology
 Endocrinology and diabetes mellitus
 Gastroenterology (with possible subspecialty in hepatology)
 General (internal) medicine (with possible subspecialty in metabolic medicine or stroke medicine)
 Genito-urinary medicine
 Geriatric medicine (with possible subspecialty in stroke medicine)
 Haematology
 Immunology
 Infectious diseases
 Intensive care medicine
 Medical microbiology
 Medical oncology (clinical or radiation oncology falls under the Royal College of Radiologists, although entry is through CMT and MRCP is required)
 Medical ophthalmology
 Medical virology
 Neurology (with possible subspecialty in stroke medicine)
 Nuclear medicine
 Occupational medicine
 Paediatric cardiology (the only pediatric subspecialty not under the Royal College of Paediatrics and Child Health)
 Palliative medicine
 Rehabilitation medicine (with possible subspecialty in stroke medicine)
 Renal medicine
 Respiratory medicine
 Rheumatology
 Sport and exercise medicine
 Tropical medicine

Many training programmes provide dual accreditation with general (internal) medicine and are involved in the general care to hospitalised patients. These are acute medicine, cardiology, Clinical Pharmacology and Therapeutics, endocrinology and diabetes mellitus, gastroenterology, infectious diseases, renal medicine, respiratory medicine and often, rheumatology. The role of general medicine, after a period of decline, was reemphasised by the Royal College of Physicians of London report from the Future Hospital Commission (2013).

European Union 
The European Board of Internal Medicine (EBIM) was formed as a collaborative effort between the European Union of Medical Specialists (UEMS) - Internal Medicine Section and the European Federation of Internal Medicine (EFIM) to provide guidance on standardizing training and practice of internal medicine throughout Europe. The EBIM published training requirements in 2016 for postgraduate education in internal medicine, and efforts to create a European Certificate of Internal Medicine (ECIM) to facilitate the free movement of medical professionals with the EU are currently underway.

The internal medicine specialist is recognized in every country in the European Union and typically requires five years of multi-disciplinary post-graduate education.  The specialty of internal medicine is seen as providing care in a wide variety of conditions involving every organ system and is distinguished from family medicine in that the latter provides a broader model of care the includes both surgery and obstetrics in both adults and children.

Australia 
Accreditation for medical education and training programs in Australia is provided by the Australian Medical Council (AMC) and the Medical Council of New Zealeand (MCNZ). The Medical Board of Australia (MBA) is the registering body for Australian doctors and provides information to the Australian Health Practitioner Regulation Agency (AHPRA). Medical graduates apply for provisional registration in order to complete intern training.  Those completing an accredited internship program are then eligible to apply for general registration. Once the candidate completes the required basic and advanced post-graduate training and a written and clinical examination, the Royal Australasian College of Physicians confers designation Fellow of the Royal Australasian College of Physicians (FRACP). Basic training consists of three years of full-time equivalent (FTE) training (including intern year) and advanced training consists of 3–4 years, depending on specialty. The fields of specialty practice are approved by the Council of Australian Governments (COAG) and managed by the MBA. The following is a list of currently recognized specialist physicians.

 Cardiology
 Clinical genetics
 Clinical pharmacology
 Endocrinology
 Gastroenterology and hepatology
 General medicine
 Geriatric medicine
 Haemotology
 Immunology and allergy
 Infectious diseases
 Medical oncology
 Nephrology
 Neurology
 Nuclear medicine
 Respiratory and sleep medicine
 Rheumatology

Canada 
After completing medical school, internists in Canada require an additional four years of training.  Internists desiring to subspecialize are required to complete two additional years of training that may begin after the third year of internist training. The Royal College of Physicians and Surgeons of Canada (RCPSC) is a national non-profit agency that oversees and accredits medical education in Canada. A full medical license in Internal Medicine in Canada requires a medical degree, a license from the Medical Council of Canada, completion of the required post-graduate education, and certification from the RCPSC.  Any additional requirements from separate medical regulatory authorities in each province or territory is also required. Internists may practice in Canada as generalists in Internal Medicine or serve in one of seventeen subspecialty areas.  Internists may work in many settings including outpatient clinics, inpatient wards, critical care units, and emergency departments.  The currently recognized subspecialties include the following:

 Critical care medicine
 Cardiology
 Infectious diseases
 Neurology
 Respiratory medicine
 Rheumatology
 Endocrinology and metabolism
 Gastroenterology
 General internal medicine
 Geriatrics
 Hematology
 Medical oncology
 Clinical allergy and immunology
 Dermatology

Medical diagnosis and treatment

Medicine is mainly focused on the art of diagnosis and treatment with medication. The diagnostic process involves gathering data, generating one or more diagnostic hypotheses, and iteratively testing these potential diagnoses against dynamic disease profiles to determine the best course of action for the patient.

Gathering data 
Data may be gathered directly from the patient in medical history-taking and physical examination. Previous medical records including laboratory findings, imaging, and clinical notes from other physicians is also an important source of information; however, it is vital to talk to and examine the patient to find out what the patient is currently experiencing to make an accurate diagnosis.

Internists often can perform and interpret diagnostic tests like EKGs and ultrasound imaging (Point-of-care Ultrasound – PoCUS).

Internists who pursue sub-specialties have additional diagnostic tools, including those listed below. 
 Cardiology: angioplasty, cardioversion, cardiac ablation, intra-aortic balloon pump
 Critical care medicine: mechanical ventilation
 Gastroenterology: endoscopy and ERCP
 Nephrology: dialysis
 Pulmonology: bronchoscopy
Other tests are ordered, and patients are also referred to specialists for further evaluation.  The effectiveness and efficiency of the specialist referral process is an area of potential improvement.

Generating diagnostic hypotheses 
Determining which pieces of information are most important to the next phase of the diagnostic process is of vital importance. It is during this stage that clinical bias like anchoring or premature closure may be introduced.  Once key findings are determined, they are compared to profiles of possible diseases.  These profiles include findings that are typically associated with the disease and are based on the likelihood that someone with the disease has a particular symptom.  A list of potential diagnoses is termed the “differential diagnosis” for the patient and is typically ordered from most likely to least likely, with special attention given to those conditions that have dire consequences for the patient if they were missed.  Epidemiology and endemic conditions are also considered in creating and evaluating the list of diagnoses.

The list is dynamic and changes as the physician obtains additional information that makes a condition more (“rule-in”) or less (“rule-out”) likely based on the disease profile.   The list is used to determine what information will be acquired next, including which diagnostic test or imaging modality to order.  The selection of tests is also based on the physician’s knowledge of the specificity and sensitivity of a particular test.

An important part of this process is knowledge of the various ways that a disease can present in a patient.  This knowledge is gathered and shared to add to the database of disease profiles used by physicians. This is especially important in rare diseases.

Communication 
Communication is a vital part of the diagnostic process. The Internist uses both synchronous and asynchronous communication with other members of the medical care team, including other internists, radiologists, specialists, and laboratory technicians.  Tools to evaluate teamwork exist and have been employed in multiple settings.

Communication to the patient is also important to ensure there is informed consent and shared decision-making throughout the diagnostic process.

Treatment 
Treatment modalities generally include both pharmacological and non-pharmacological, depending on the primary diagnosis.  Additional treatment options include referral to specialist care including physical therapy and rehabilitation.  Treatment recommendations differ in the acute inpatient and outpatient settings. Continuity of care and long-term follow-up is crucial in successful patient outcomes.

Prevention and other services 
Aside from diagnosing and treating acute conditions, the Internist may also assess disease risk and recommend preventive screening and intervention.  Some of the tools available to the Internist include genetic evaluation.

Internists also routinely provide pre-operative medical evaluations including individualized assessment and communication of operative risk.

Training the next generation of internists is an important part of the profession.  As mentioned above, post-graduate medical education is provided by licensed physicians as part of accredited education programs that are usually affiliated with teaching hospitals. Studies show that there are no differences in patient outcomes in teaching versus non-teaching facilities. Medical research is an important part of most post-graduate education programs, and many licensed physicians continue to be involved in research activities after completing post-graduate training.

Ethics 
Inherent in any medical profession are legal and ethical considerations. Specific laws vary by jurisdiction and may or may not be congruent with ethical considerations. Thus, a strong ethical foundation is paramount to any medical profession. Medical ethics guidelines in the Western world typically follow four principles including beneficence, non-maleficence, patient autonomy, and justice. These principles underlie the patient-physician relationship and the obligation to put the welfare and interests of the patient above their own.

Patient-physician relationship 
The relationship is built upon the physician obligations of competency, respect for the patient, and appropriate referrals while the patient requirements include decision-making and provides or withdraws consent for any treatment plan.  Good communication is key to a strong relationship but has ethical considerations as well, including proper use of electronic communication and clear documentation.

Treatment and telemedicine 
Providing treatment including prescribing medications based on remote information gathering without a proper established relationship is not accepted as good practice with few exceptions. These exceptions include cross-coverage within a practice and certain public health urgent or emergent issues.

The ethics of telemedicine including questions on its impact to diagnosis, physician-patient relationship, and continuity of care have been raised;, however, with appropriate use and specific guidelines, risks may be minimized and the benefits including increased access to care may be realized.

Financial issues and conflicts of interest 
Ethical considerations in financial include accurate billing practices and clearly defined financial relationships.  Physicians have both a professional duty and obligation under the justice principle to ensure that patients are provided the same care regardless of status or ability to pay.  However, informal copayment forgiveness may have legal ramifications and the providing professional courtesy may have negatively impact care.

Physicians must disclose all possible conflicts of interest including financial relationships, investments, research and referral relationships, and any other instances that may subjugate or give the appearance of subjugating patient care to self-interest.

Other topics 
Other foundational ethical considerations include privacy, confidentiality, accurate and complete medical records, electronic health records, disclosure, and informed decision-making and consent.

Electronic health records have been shown to improve patient care but have risks including data breaches and inappropriate and/or unauthorized disclosure of protected health information.

Withholding information from a patient is typically seen as unethical and in violation of a patient’s right to make informed decisions.  However, in situations where a patient has requested not to be informed or to have the information provided to a second party or in an emergency situation in which the patient does not have decision-making capacity, withholding information may be appropriate.

See also 

 Royal Australasian College of Physicians
 Royal College of Physicians and Surgeons of Canada

References

Further reading

External links
The American Academy of Allergy, Asthma & Immunology (AAAAI); American Board of Allergy & Immunology (ABAI)
International Society of Internal Medicine
Internal Medicine Society of Australia and New Zealand
The American Board of Internal Medicine
Canadian Society of Internal Medicine
The American College of Osteopathic Internists
American College of Physicians

 
Hospital staff